Molyullah is a locality in north-eastern Victoria, Australia. The locality is part of the Rural City of Benalla local government area.

Molyullah is well known for its Easter sports which are held every year.

References

Towns in Victoria (Australia)
Rural City of Benalla